Street Code is both the short, ten page autobiographical comic story and the 2009 mini-comic by American writer-artist Jack Kirby. Both Bill Sienkiewicz and Jeff Zapata consider it among Kirby's greatest works, and it supplanted all other works in the minds of Jack and wife Roz.  Roz appreciated it so much she framed the two-page spread from the story and gave it pride of place on her wall. It was commissioned by Richard Kyle in 1983 but did not see print until 1990 in Argosy vol.3 #2, with lettering by Bill Spicer. The story was shot from Kirby's pencils. Kyle intended to print it with a colored tone behind it, which Kirby requested not be too colorful, but rather drab to suit the times. Kyle said 

The strip has been printed on four occasions:
 Argosy vol. 3 #2 (Richard Kyle Publications) (1990) with lettering by Bill Spicer
 Streetwise (TwoMorrows Publishing) (2000) with lettering by Ken Bruzenak
 Kirby: King of Comics (Abrams Books) (2008) with lettering by Bill Spicer
 Street Code (Kirby Museum) (2009) with lettering by Jack Kirby

References

Comics by Jack Kirby
Works originally published in Argosy (magazine)